Frederic Eleazer Boothby (December 3, 1845 – January 1923) was an American railroad manager and politician. Boothby was born in 1845 in Norway, Maine and studied at Waterville Academy in Waterville, Maine. Boothby moved to Portland, Maine and was elected Mayor in 1901. He was re-elected in 1902 and 1903. In 1904, he was a delegate at-large to the Republican National Convention in Chicago which chose Theodore Roosevelt as the party's nominee. He was employed by the Maine Central Railroad Company and worked for the company in a number of roles. He was Episcopalian. In 1916, Boothby was elected mayor of Waterville and served in that position for one year. He died in 1923.

References

1845 births
1923 deaths
People from Norway, Maine
Mayors of Portland, Maine
Mayors of Waterville, Maine
Maine Republicans
Businesspeople from Maine